The 2001 Proximus 24 Spa World Championship GT was the 55th running of the Spa 24 Hours. It was also the seventh round the 2001 FIA GT Championship season, marking the first time that the FIA GT Championship had the Spa 24 Hours on their schedule. The addition of the FIA GT Championship turned the Spa 24 Hours from a touring car event into a sports car race.

This event combined the FIA GT's two classes (GT and N-GT) with cars from smaller national sports car series (designated Category 2) as well as cars from single-make series (designated Category 3). It took place at the Circuit de Spa-Francorchamps, Belgium, over August 4–5, 2001.

Official results
Class winners in bold. Cars failing to complete 70% of winner's distance marked as Not Classified (NC).

Statistics
 Pole position – #3 Team Carsport Holland – 2:24.053
 Fastest lap – #3 Team Carsport Holland – 2:23.001
 Distance – 3679.104 km
 Average speed – 152.999 km/h

References

 
 
 

S
Spa 24 Hours
Spa 24 Hours